Abdullah Aidit (23 October 1900 – 14 February 1969) was an Indonesian politician and civil servant who served as a member of the Provisional People's Representative Council. He was the father of D. N. Aidit, chairman of the Indonesian Communist Party who was executed in 1965 following the 30 September Movement.

Early life and education
Abdullah was born in Tanjung Pandan on 23 October 1900. He was the son of Haji Ismail, a fishery businessman in Belitung. He worked as a forest ranger, and due to his family connections he managed to put all his eight children to school at Hollandsch-Inlandsche School. He was active in the local Islamic community, founding a local Islamic education institution.

Two of his sons, Achmad Aidit and Murad Aidit, studied in Batavia, at a significant cost to the family's finances. When Achmad Aidit wanted to change his name, Abdullah resisted, primarily because he did not want to handle administrative problems associated with a change of name. He eventually relented, and Achmad changed his name to Dipa Nusantara Aidit.

Political career 
During the Indonesian National Revolution, Abdullah was one of the leaders of pro-independence militia groups in Belitung, and briefly went to Yogyakarta. In 1950, he served as a member of the People's Representative Council of the United States of Indonesia as a delegate from Belitung (not representing any political parties), and then the Provisional People's Representative Council until his resignation on 25 June 1954. He was replaced by Njoto, a member of the Indonesian Communist Party. He was a member of the Indonesian Islamic Union Party's leadership committee between 1953 and 1955.

Abdullah was staying at D. N. Aidit's Jakarta home at the night of 30 September 1965. In the aftermath of the coup attempt, D. N. Aidit was arrested by soldiers, and Abdullah for a time took care of his son's children. He was also briefly arrested by soldiers in a case of mistaken identity (unlike his son, Abdullah was not wanted), and was released after one day. At that time, he was a legislator of the National People's Party. Abdullah was later assisted by deputy prime minister Chaerul Saleh in returning to Belitung. He died alone at his house in Tanjung Pandan on 14 February 1969, his body only being discovered by his neighbor's wife three days after his death.

Notes

References

1900 births
1968 deaths
Members of the People's Representative Council, 1950
People from Belitung Regency
Indonesian Muslims